Water Ski at the 2010 South American Games in Medellín was held from March 27 to March 30. All games were played at Club Campestre Llano grande.

Medal summary

Medal table

Men

Women

References

2010 South American Games
2010 South American Games
South